Mitchigamea or Michigamea was a language spoken by Mitchigamea people.

In 1673, Jacques Marquette and Louis Jolliet used a Mitchigamea man, who only spoke Illinois poorly, as a translator between the Illinois-speaking French, and the Siouan-speaking Quapaw. Jean Bernard Bossu provided two sentences from the mid-18th century which, according to John Koontz, indicate that Michigamea was a Siouan language of the Mississippi Valley branch.

References

Languages extinct in the 18th century
Mitchigamea